Iceland competed at the 2015 World Championships in Athletics in Beijing, China, from 22–30 August 2015.

Results
(q – qualified, NM – no mark, SB – season best)

Women 
Track and road events

Field events

Sources 
Icelandic team

Nations at the 2015 World Championships in Athletics
World Championships in Athletics
Iceland at the World Championships in Athletics